Upper Staircase is the upper eastern portion of Skelton Glacier, just north of The Landing, which merges into the Skelton Neve in the Hillary Coast region of the Ross Dependency. Surveyed in 1957 by the New Zealand party of the Commonwealth Trans-Antarctic Expedition (1956–58) and so named because of its staircase effect in being the key for the approach to the polar plateau.

References

Glaciers of the Ross Dependency
Hillary Coast